Vincent Provoost (born 7 February 1984) is a Belgian footballer who plays as a defensive midfielder for Zwevezele in the Belgian Division 2.

Honours
Club Brugge
Belgian Super Cup: 2004

References

External links
Guardian Football

1984 births
Living people
Belgian footballers
K.S.V. Roeselare players
Club Brugge KV players
Association football midfielders
Footballers from Bruges
K.V. Kortrijk players
Royal Excel Mouscron players
Belgian Pro League players
K.S.K. Voorwaarts Zwevezele players